Nicki Richards (born Honolulu, Hawaii, United States on March 24) is an American singer, songwriter, producer and actress based in Manhattan, New York City. She is also known as a backing singer for a number of renowned artists and on a big number of studio recordings. Her father was a high-ranking African-American naval officer and her mother, Donna Blackmon, a talented singer. Nicki's brother, Philip Richards is a singer / musician in his own right and collaborated with her in her works.

Nicki Richards had her first public appearances in commercials when she was only 5. She had her break when she won the Grand Prize on the singing competition Star Search. She consequently recorded and performed for the past several years with Madonna, (including Confessions Tour, Sticky & Sweet Tour, MDNA Tour and  Rebel Heart Tour), Mariah Carey, Whitney Houston, Mick Jagger, Michael Jackson, Tina Turner, Gloria Estefan, Celine Dion, Stevie Wonder, Linda Ronstadt, Mary J. Blige, Missy Elliott, Lenny Kravitz, Anastacia, Lady Gaga, Bette Midler, Maxi Priest, Al Green, The Cover Girls, Daniel Levitin and many more.

In 1991, she released her own debut album Naked (To the World) on Atlantic Records written and co-produced by her after being signed to a deal by the legendary Ahmet Ertegun. She followed that up with Nicki in 2008.

She had her acting debut in 1999 in Colorz of Rage directed by Dale Resteghini and in Chicago as part of a female ensemble and in two musical comedies by Robert Klein. She also took part in a number of theater productions Cy Coleman's Like Jazz in Los Angeles, Jim Steinman's Over The Top on the East Coast, and the Penumbra Theatre Company's "Spunk" by Zora Neale Hurston and "Beehive" both in the Minneapolis/St. Paul area.

She performed on the PBS television show "Between the Lions", a puppet educational show. She has also appeared on a number of commercials (Burger King, Coca-Cola and Colgate).

Discography
1991: Naked (To the World)
2008: Nicki
2012: Bedtime Story (Tell Me)

Filmography
1999: Colorz of Rage .... Debbie
2000: Robert Klein: Child in His 50s .... Singer (TV)
2002: Chicago .... Female ensemble (credited as Nicky Richards)
2005: Robert Klein: The Amorous Busboy of Decatur Avenue .... Singer (TV)

Theater
Like Jazz written by Cy Coleman and Marilyn & Alan Bergman, directed by Gordon Davidson (world premiere, Los Angeles)
Over the Top directed by Jim Steinman (East Coast)
Spunk directed by Zora Neale Hurston (Saint Paul, Minnesota)
Beehive (Saint Paul, Minnesota)

References

External links
Official website

MySpace
Facebook
Twitter

American women singer-songwriters
American actresses
Living people
Year of birth missing (living people)
Musicians from Honolulu
21st-century American women
Singer-songwriters from Hawaii